EagleBank is a community bank headquartered in Bethesda, Maryland, with assets of more than $10 billion, with operations in the Washington, D.C. metropolitan area. EagleBank conducts full service commercial banking through small footprint of 20 branches in Montgomery County, Maryland; Washington, D.C.; and Northern Virginia.
EagleBank is primarily known for Commercial Real Estate (CRE) loans with CRE comprising two thirds of the bank's loan portfolio as of September 2019. The bank was founded in 1998 under the holding company Eagle Bancorp Inc, which was established in 1997.

Operations
As of September 30, 2019, commercial real estate and real estate construction represented 70% and C&I loans represented 19% of EagleBank's loan portfolio. The Bank also originates and sells residential mortgages through its Eagle Mortgage division. 85% of all loans are secured or partially secured by real estate. As of September 30, 2019, the bank's total assets were $10.1 billion.

In response to the COVID crisis during 2020, EagleBank made 1,441 loans through the SBA's Paycheck Protection Program (PPP), and as of November of that year, had begun processing applications for forgiveness of the loans, a process expected to be completed sometime in 2021. EagleBank's  PPP loans totaled approximately $500 million and were processed in less than two months. The bank had processed less than 100 SBA loans in all of 2019. Many of EagleBank's commercial loan customers, particularly hotels, restaurants, and other service industries, were hit hard by the economic impact of the COVID-19 pandemic. In response, the bank offered these business owners a 90-day deferral on payments and later extended some of these loans by an additional 90 days as the crisis continued.

The Bank is a lender partner for Washington, DC Mayor Muriel Bowser’s Work in DC, Buy in DC program, offering mortgage loan options that include below-market interest rates to District Government employees looking to buy and live in the District. In addition to the Work in DC, Buy in DC program, EagleBank also established the Gaithersburg Heroes program in 2019.  In partnership with the City of Gaithersburg, EagleBank provides down payment assistance for teachers, firefighters, police and first responders seeking to buy homes. Last fall, EagleBank also announced that it would be participating with Landed, a financial services company providing down payment support and homebuyer education programs for K-12 teachers and school employees in the District of Columbia.

History 
EagleBank was established by Ronald D. Paul, former president of Bethesda-based Allegiance Bank, and a former banker from Central National Bank. Eagle Bancorp, Inc., was incorporated as a bank holding company in the state of Maryland on October 28, 1997. On June 9, 1998, the company became a public company via an initial public offering. On July 20, 1998, EagleBank opened its first office in Rockville, Maryland, after receiving approvals from the State of Maryland and the Federal Reserve System, and acceptance for deposit insurance from the Federal Deposit Insurance Corporation. Branch offices in Bethesda and Silver Spring were opened several months afterwards. The bank opened the Silver Spring office in 1999, a location on K Street in Washington, D.C., in 2000, and a location near Shady Grove Adventist Hospital in 2002.

New capital of $30 million was raised with a secondary stock offering in 2003. The new capital funded a new location on Rockville Pike in 2003 and a location near Dupont Circle in 2004. EagleBank opened a regional office at McPherson Square in 2005 and a branch office in Chevy Chase in 2006.
In December 2008, the United States Department of the Treasury purchased $38.2 million of assets from EagleBank as part of the Troubled Asset Relief Program. Chief Executive Officer Ronald Paul said that EagleBank was strong financially, but it was finding it extremely difficult to raise private capital because of the financial crisis of 2007–2008. In 2010, EagleBank received $71.9 million funding so it could lend more to small businesses as part of the United States Department of Treasury's Small Business Jobs Act of 2010. The funds were repaid to the US Treasury by EagleBank in 2015 after a stock sale.

In 2013, EagleBank teamed with Graystone Consulting to provide wealth management services.
In March 2019, EagleBank's founder and CEO, Ron Paul, announced his retirement. Susan G. Riel was appointed CEO and President and Norm Pozez was appointed chairman.
Riel was named one of American Banker's five-community bank CEOs to watch in 2020. At the time EagleBank was approaching $10 billion in assets, a growth point that would trigger increased regulation.
In June 2020 the bank added Paul Saltzman to its executive team as executive vice president and chief legal officer. In the 2/28/2020 issue of the Washington Business Journal, Eagle Bancorp Inc. ranked #2 on the Women on Public Company Boards in Greater D.C. list.

Notable Acquisitions 
In September 2008, EagleBank bought Fidelity and Trust Bank in a $13.1 million transaction.
In July 2011, EagleBank announced it would buy Alliance Bank for $31 million, but the transaction was called off five months later because they could not agree on the terms of the deal.
In November 2014, EagleBank acquired Virginia Heritage Bank for $183 million.

Sponsorships & Company Initiatives 
Eagle Bancorp Foundation was established in 2005. Funded from the proceeds of its golf fundraising event, the foundation supports organizations involved in the fight against breast cancer.
In 2014, the tenth annual event raised more than $375,000 to support local hospitals and charities involved in fighting breast cancer,
and in its fifteenth year in 2019 raised more than $424,000, totalling $4.3 million over the life of the program.
In 2008 and 2009, the bank sponsored the Military Bowl, originally named the EagleBank Bowl, a college football bowl game first held in December 2008.
The Bank purchased the naming rights to the EagleBank Arena, formerly known as the Patriot Center, in May 2015 following a partnership deal with George Mason University.
In 2016, EagleBank launched a Commercial Banking Development Program to open a career path for future commercial bankers. The program exposes recent graduates to multiple departments and aspects of finance to help them determine what areas interest them.
EagleBank and D.C. United entered into a five-year partnership in 2018 that made EagleBank the official bank of D.C. United and created the EagleBank Club at Audi Field.
In 2020, the bank gave $5 million to the Washington Housing Initiative Impact Pool, a program launched by the Federal City Council to promote the creation of affordable workforce housing. During the COVID-19 crisis, the EagleBank Foundation distributed $100,000 to 10 D.C.-area organizations, including hospitals ($60K), food banks ($30K), and first responder aid organizations ($10K). Funds were used to provide PPE, in-room technology for hospital staff, and meals for families in the Washington Metropolitan area. EagleBank itself provided $50,000 in aid to displaced George Mason University students.

Controversies 
In 2011, the company was reported to be the source of legislation introduced by Council of the District of Columbia member Jack Evans that would require the city's funds to be held at local banks.
On July 18, 2019, the company's stock price fell as much as 25% after it disclosed that it had spent $2.7 million on legal fees related to the relationship between a former director and Council of the District of Columbia member Jack Evans.  It had previously been disclosed that Ron Paul had received a subpoena related to his relationship with Evans.

In 2022, the company was ordered to pay $22.9M to the Securities and Exchange Commission (SEC) and the Federal Reserve to settle claims the bank's former CEO had engaged in insider lending. Former EagleBank CEO Ron Paul has been banned permanently from working in the banking industry and he was fined about $521,000. The 2022 settlement ended a 3-year probe by regulators into alleged third-party lending and improper disclosures by EagleBank.

References

External links

1998 establishments in Maryland
Banks based in Maryland
Banks established in 1998
Companies based in Bethesda, Maryland
Companies listed on the Nasdaq
American companies established in 1998